
Year 418 (CDXVIII) was a common year starting on Tuesday (link will display the full calendar) of the Julian calendar. At the time, it was known as the Year of the Consulship of Honorius and Theodosius (or, less frequently, year 1171 Ab urbe condita). The denomination 418 for this year has been used since the early medieval period, when the Anno Domini calendar era became the prevalent method in Europe for naming years.

Events

By place

Roman Empire 
 Emperor Honorius bribes Wallia, king of the Visigoths, into regaining Hispania for the Roman Empire. His victory over the Vandals in 416 forces them to retire to Andalusia. The Visigothic territory in Gaul now extends from the Garonne to the Loire, and becomes known as the Visigothic Kingdom.
 Theodoric I becomes king of the Visigoths. He completes the settlements in Gallia Aquitania and expands his military power to the south.

By topic

Religion 
 December 28 – Pope Boniface I succeeds Zosimus as the 42nd pope.
 Eulalius is elected antipope of Rome. He claims in a letter to Honorius his recognition as pope.

Births 
 Ricimer, Germanic Roman general
 Yuryaku, emperor of Japan (approximate date)

Deaths 
 December 26 – Pope Zosimus
 Attaces, king of the Alans
 Wallia, king of the Visigoths

References